The 35th Reserve Division (35. Reserve-Division) was a unit of the Imperial German Army in World War I. The division was formed on the mobilization of the German Army in August 1914. The division was disbanded during the demobilization of the German Army after World War I. The division began the war as part of the central reserve of Fortress Thorn (Hauptreserve/Festung Thorn). Although designated a reserve division, initially, it was primarily composed of Landwehr units. In 1916, it was completely reorganized, receiving new brigade headquarters and newly formed regiments.

Combat chronicle

The 35th Reserve Division began the war on the Eastern Front. It fought in the Battle of Tannenberg and the First Battle of the Masurian Lakes. In 1915, it was transferred from Poland to Hungary and saw action in the Gorlice-Tarnów Offensive. Thereafter, it remained in White Russia until the armistice on the Eastern Front, when it went to the Ukraine, where it remained until March 1919. Allied intelligence rated the division as fourth class.

Order of battle on mobilization

The order of battle of the 35th Reserve Division on mobilization was as follows:

5.Landwehr-Infanterie-Brigade
Landwehr-Infanterie-Regiment Nr. 2
Landwehr-Infanterie-Regiment Nr. 9
20.Landwehr-Infanterie-Brigade
Landwehr-Infanterie-Regiment Nr. 19
Kgl. Sächs. Landwehr-Infanterie-Regiment Nr. 107
schweres Reserve-Reiter-Regiment Nr. 3
Ersatz-Abteilung/Feldartillerie-Regiment Nr. 35
Ersatz-Abteilung/Feldartillerie-Regiment Nr. 81
1.Reserve-Kompanie/1. Westpreußisches Pionier-Bataillon Nr. 17

Order of battle on April 1, 1916

The 35th Reserve Division was triangularized in July 1915. The order of battle on April 1, 1916, was as follows:

5.Landwehr-Infanterie-Brigade
Landwehr-Infanterie-Regiment Nr. 2
Landwehr-Infanterie-Regiment Nr. 9
Kgl. Sächs. Landwehr-Infanterie-Regiment Nr. 107
Landsturm-Infanterie-Regiment Nr. 13
schwere Reserve-Reiter-Regiment Nr. 3
Reserve-Feldartillerie-Regiment Nr. 35
1.Reserve-Kompanie/1. Westpreußisches Pionier-Bataillon Nr. 17
Landsturm-Pionier-Kompanie Nr. 9
Minenwerfer-Kompanie Nr. 235

Order of battle on December 15, 1916

In November 1916, the 35th Reserve Division was completely reorganized. The 5th Landwehr Infantry Brigade and the 2nd and 9th Landwehr Infantry Regiments were sent to the 226th Infantry Division and the 167th Infantry Brigade headquarters was received from the 84th Infantry Division. Two newly raised infantry regiments, the 420th and 421st, replaced the lost Landwehr infantry regiments. The order of battle on December 15, 1916, was as follows:

167.Infanterie-Brigade
Infanterie-Regiment Nr. 420
Infanterie-Regiment Nr. 421
Kgl. Sächs. Landwehr-Infanterie-Regiment Nr. 107
Landsturm-Infanterie-Regiment Nr. 13
2.Eskadron/Jäger-Regiment zu Pferde Nr. 4
Reserve-Feldartillerie-Regiment Nr. 35
1.Reserve-Kompanie/1. Westpreußisches Pionier-Bataillon Nr. 17
Minenwerfer-Kompanie Nr. 235

Order of battle on March 9, 1918

Over the course of the war, other changes took place, including the formation of a signals command and a pioneer battalion. The remaining non-Prussian unit, the Saxon 107th Landwehr Infantry Regiment, was replaced by a Baden unit, the 438th Infantry Regiment. The 13th Landsturm Infantry Regiment was transferred out of the division. The order of battle on March 9, 1918, was as follows:

167.Infanterie-Brigade
Infanterie-Regiment Nr. 420
Infanterie-Regiment Nr. 421
Infanterie-Regiment Nr. 438
2.Eskadron/Jäger-Regiment zu Pferde Nr. 4
Reserve-Feldartillerie-Regiment Nr. 35
Stab Pionier-Bataillon Nr. 335
1.Reserve-Kompanie/1. Westpreußisches Pionier-Bataillon Nr. 17
Minenwerfer-Kompanie Nr. 235
Divisions-Nachrichten-Kommandeur 435

References
 35. Reserve-Division (Chronik 1914/1918) - Der erste Weltkrieg
 Hermann Cron et al., Ruhmeshalle unserer alten Armee (Berlin, 1935)
 Hermann Cron, Geschichte des deutschen Heeres im Weltkriege 1914-1918 (Berlin, 1937)
 Günter Wegner, Stellenbesetzung der deutschen Heere 1815-1939. (Biblio Verlag, Osnabrück, 1993), Bd. 1
 Histories of Two Hundred and Fifty-One Divisions of the German Army which Participated in the War (1914-1918), compiled from records of Intelligence section of the General Staff, American Expeditionary Forces, at General Headquarters, Chaumont, France 1919 (1920)

Notes

Infantry divisions of Germany in World War I
Military units and formations established in 1914
Military units and formations disestablished in 1919
1914 establishments in Germany